Araniella displicata, the sixspotted orbweaver, is a species of orb weaver in the spider family Araneidae. It is found in North America, Europe, a range from Russia to Kazakhstan, China, Korea, and Japan.

Description 

They come in a variety of colors: Brown, White, Tan, Orange, Red, or Yellow. These specie get the "Six-spotted" name from the six dots on the bottom of their abdomen. These dots are usually black with a lighter ring around it. The female are typically larger than the males.

Etymology 
Araniella stems from the Latin word Araneus, meaning "spider." The suffix -ella is a Latin ending for "little." Common name is the six-spotted orb weaver

Biology & Distribution 
Araniella displicata adults are active in the beginning of summer, around may or june, to lay their eggs and then disappear. They usually lay their eggs around june or july, when the females are fully mature. The eggs are in sacs that could possibly be seen in curled leaf, and the mother is not far from them.

They reside in a small orb web spun in a tree or shrub. The web is normally made on a leaf, and the leaf is then manipulated to become an easy trap. They can spin a large web sometimes between branches and stems. These tiny orb weavers can live in forests edges, field edges, or in woodlands. They would usually be in trees and shrubs, and target the larger leaves for a larger web.

Their diet consists of small insects: beetles, plant bugs and flies are more favorable.

References

External links

 

Araniella
Articles created by Qbugbot
Spiders described in 1847